Saint-Hilaire is a commune in the Aude department in the Occitanie region in southern France.

Geography
The commune of Saint-Hilaire is situated in the Aude department, midway between Limoux and Carcassonne in the region of the Carcassès. It is mostly covered by the forest of Crausse-Rabassié. The river Lauquet borders it to the north.  It is crossed by the Meridian of Paris, otherwise known as the Green Meridian.

History
The history of Saint-Hilaire is closely linked with that of the abbey. It begins in the Roman era but the most important remains  date from the Middle Ages. In the eighth century, the abbey was built under the name of Saint Saturnin and then Saint Hilaire, Bishop of Carcassonne in the sixth century. Over the course of centuries, the village grew to surround the abbey.

The abbots built fortifications around the village to protect it from the troubles of the Hundred Years War. A document of 1386 regulates the care of the keys of the village gates. In 1574, the village was burned and partly destroyed by the Protestants of the Lord of Villar.

During the French Revolution, Saint-Hilaire experienced some troubles. In 1792, troops had to be sent to maintain public order.

Population

Its inhabitants are known as Saint-Hilairois.

Sights

Abbey of Saint-Hilaire

This ancient and fortified Benedictine abbey was founded at the end of the eighth century and dedicated to Saint Saturnin. In the tenth century, in obedience to the will of the Count of Carcassonne, the abbey changed its name and was dedicated to Saint Hilaire, the first Bishop of Carcassonne in the sixth century.

The monastery enjoyed a certain prosperity until the thirteenth century, but at the time of the Hundred Years War it suffered the devastations of war, the ravages of the Black Death and periods of famine.

After a long period of decline, the abbey closed in 1748.

In 1531, the monks of Saint-Hilaire discovered the first effervescent wine in the world, now known as Blanquette de Limoux.

Today it is possible to explore the ancient monastic buildings by guided visit.

See also
Limoux wine
Communes of the Aude department

References

Communes of Aude
Aude communes articles needing translation from French Wikipedia